

Gongsun Du (150? – 204), courtesy name Shengji, was a Chinese military general, politician, and warlord who lived during the late Eastern Han dynasty of China. He was not able to participate in battle until Dong Zhuo seized power from Emperor Shao. Dong Zhuo, hoping to expand the empire, gave Gongsun Du the command to attack present-day Korea from across the sea. Gongsun Du was successful in his attack and also took control of the existing Daifang and Lelang commanderies established during the earlier period of the Han dynasty, among others.

Under another order from Dong Zhuo, Gongsun Du took over Liaoning. This presaged the development of Gongsun Du's power base in the northeast. Gongsun Du later sent Gongsun Muo and Zhang Pi to present-day South Korea in an attempt to gain more land. He died in 204 and was succeeded by his son, Gongsun Kang, who continued to rule northeastern China.

See also
 Lists of people of the Three Kingdoms
 Gongsun Zan

References

Citations

Bibliography
 Chen Shou (3rd century). Records of the Three Kingdoms (Sanguozhi).
 
 Pei Songzhi (5th century). Annotations to Records of the Three Kingdoms (Sanguozhi zhu).

150 births
204 deaths
Han dynasty warlords

Han dynasty generals from Liaoning
Han dynasty politicians from Liaoning
Political office-holders in Hebei
Political office-holders in Liaoning
Politicians from Liaoyang